Alternative medicine describes any practice which aims to achieve the healing effects of medicine, but which lacks biological plausibility and is untested or untestable. Complementary medicine (CM), complementary and alternative medicine (CAM), integrated medicine or integrative medicine (IM), and holistic medicine are among many rebrandings of the same phenomenon.

Terms for alternative medicine 

The terms alternative medicine, complementary medicine, integrative medicine, holistic medicine, natural medicine, unorthodox medicine, fringe medicine, unconventional medicine, and new age medicine are used interchangeably as having the same meaning and are almost synonymous in most contexts.

The meaning of the term "alternative" in the expression "alternative medicine", is not that it is an effective alternative to medical science, although some alternative medicine promoters may use the loose terminology to give the appearance of effectiveness. Loose terminology may also be used to suggest meaning that a dichotomy exists when it does not, e.g., the use of the expressions "Western medicine" and "Eastern medicine" to suggest that the difference is a cultural difference between the Asiatic east and the European west, rather than that the difference is between evidence-based medicine and treatments that do not work.

Complementary or integrative medicine  
Complementary medicine (CM) or integrative medicine (IM) is when alternative medicine is used together with functional medical treatment, in a belief that it improves the effect of treatments. For example, acupuncture (piercing the body with needles to influence the flow of a supernatural energy) might be believed to increase the effectiveness or "complement" science-based medicine when used at the same time. Instead, significant drug interactions caused by alternative therapies may make treatments less effective, notably in cancer therapy. Integrative medicine has been described as an attempt to bring pseudoscience into academic science-based medicine. Due to its many names, the field has been criticized by writer Rose Shapiro for what she describes as intense rebranding of what are essentially the same practices.

CAM is an abbreviation of the phrase complementary and alternative medicine. The 2019 World Health Organization (WHO) Global Report on Traditional and Complementary Medicine states that the terms complementary and alternative medicine "refer to a broad set of health care practices that are not part of that country’s own traditional or conventional medicine and are not fully integrated into the dominant health care system. They are used interchangeably with traditional medicine in some countries."

Other terms

Traditional medicine comprises medical aspects of traditional knowledge that developed over generations within the folk beliefs of various societies, including indigenous peoples, before the era of modern medicine. The 2019 WHO study defines traditional medicine as "the sum total of the knowledge, skill and practices based on the theories, beliefs and experiences indigenous to different cultures, whether explicable or not, used in the maintenance of health as well as in the prevention, diagnosis, improvement or treatment of physical and mental illness."

Holistic medicine is another rebranding of alternative medicine. In this case, the words balance and holism are often used alongside complementary or integrative, claiming to take into account a "whole" person, in contrast to the supposed reductionism of medicine.

Definitions of alternative medicine 

Alternative medicine is defined loosely as a set of products, practices, and theories that are believed or perceived by their users to have the healing effects of medicine, but whose effectiveness has not been established using scientific methods, or whose theory and practice is not part of biomedicine, or whose theories or practices are directly contradicted by scientific evidence or scientific principles used in biomedicine. "Biomedicine" or "medicine" is that part of medical science that applies principles of biology, physiology, molecular biology, biophysics, and other natural sciences to clinical practice, using scientific methods to establish the effectiveness of that practice. Unlike medicine, an alternative product or practice does not originate from using scientific methods, but may instead be based on hearsay, religion, tradition, superstition, belief in supernatural energies, pseudoscience, errors in reasoning, propaganda, fraud, or other unscientific sources.

Challenges in defining alternative medicine

Terminology has shifted over time, reflecting the preferred branding of practitioners. For example, the United States National Institutes of Health department studying alternative medicine, currently named the National Center for Complementary and Integrative Health (NCCIH), was established as the Office of Alternative Medicine (OAM) and was renamed the National Center for Complementary and Alternative Medicine (NCCAM) before obtaining its current name. Therapies are often framed as "natural" or "holistic", in apparent opposition to conventional medicine which is "artificial" and "narrow in scope", statements which are intentionally misleading.

Prominent members of the science and biomedical science community say that it is not meaningful to define an alternative medicine that is separate from a conventional medicine, because the expressions "conventional medicine", "alternative medicine", "complementary medicine", "integrative medicine",  and "holistic medicine" do not refer to any medicine at all. Others say that alternative medicine cannot be precisely defined because of the diversity of theories and practices it includes, and because the boundaries between alternative and conventional medicine overlap, are porous, and change. The systems and practices it refers to are diffuse, and its boundaries poorly defined. Healthcare practices categorized as alternative may differ in their historical origin, theoretical basis, diagnostic technique, therapeutic practice and in their relationship to the medical mainstream. Some alternative therapies, such as traditional Chinese medicine (TCM) and Ayurveda, have antique origins in East or South Asia and are entirely alternative medical systems; .</ref> others, such as homeopathy and chiropractic, have origins in Europe or the United States and emerged in the eighteenth and nineteenth centuries. Some, such as osteopathy and chiropractic, employ manipulative physical methods of treatment; others, such as meditation and prayer, are based on mind-body interventions. Under a definition of alternative medicine as "non-mainstream", treatments considered alternative in one location may be considered conventional in another.

Critics say the expression is deceptive because it implies there is an effective alternative to science-based medicine, and that complementary is deceptive because it implies that the treatment increases the effectiveness of (complements) science-based medicine, while alternative medicines that have been tested nearly always have no measurable positive effect compared to a placebo. It has been said that "there is really no such thing as alternative medicine, just medicine that works and medicine that doesn't", and that the very idea of "alternative" treatments is paradoxical because any treatment proven to work is by definition "medicine."

Different types of definitions
Some definitions seek to specify alternative medicine in terms of its social and political marginality to mainstream healthcare. This can refer to the lack of support that alternative therapies receive from medical scientists regarding access to research funding, sympathetic coverage in the medical press, or inclusion in the standard medical curriculum. In 1993, the British Medical Association (BMA) stated that it referred to "...those forms of treatment which are not widely used by the conventional healthcare professions, and the skills of which are not taught as part of the undergraduate curriculum of conventional medical and paramedical healthcare courses". In a US context, a definition coined in 1993 by the Harvard-based physician David M. Eisenberg described alternative medicine as "interventions neither taught widely in medical schools nor generally available in US hospitals". In a definition published in 2000 by the World Health Organization (WHO), CAM was defined as a broad set of health care practices that are not part of that country's own tradition and are not integrated into the dominant health care system. A widely used descriptive definition devised by the US NCCIH calls it "a group of diverse medical and health care systems, practices, and products that are not generally considered part of conventional medicine". However, these descriptive definitions are inadequate in the present-day when some conventional doctors offer alternative medical treatments and introductory courses or modules can be offered as part of standard undergraduate medical training; alternative medicine is taught in more than half of US medical schools and US health insurers are increasingly willing to provide reimbursement for alternative therapies. In 1999, 7.7% of US hospitals reported using some form of alternative therapy; this proportion had risen to 37.7% by 2008. A 15-year systematic review published in 2022 on the global acceptance and use of CAM among medical specialists found the overall acceptance of CAM at 52% and the overall use at 45%.

An expert panel at a conference hosted in 1995 by the US Office for Alternative Medicine (OAM), devised a theoretical definition of alternative medicine as "a broad domain of healing resources ... other than those intrinsic to the politically dominant health system of a particular society or culture in a given historical period". This definition has been widely adopted, and has been cited by the UK Department of Health, attributed as the definition used by the Cochrane Collaboration, and, with some modification, was preferred in the 2005 consensus report of the US Institute of Medicine. This definition, an expansion of Eisenberg's 1993 formulation, is silent regarding questions of the medical effectiveness of alternative therapies. Its proponents hold that it thus avoids relativism about differing forms of medical knowledge and, while it is an essentially political definition, this should not imply that the dominance of mainstream medicine is solely due to political forces. According to this definition, alternative and mainstream medicine can only be differentiated with reference to what is "intrinsic to the politically dominant health system of a particular society of culture". However, there is neither a reliable method to distinguish between cultures and subcultures, nor to attribute them as dominant or subordinate, nor any accepted criteria to determine the dominance of a cultural entity. If the culture of a politically dominant healthcare system is held to be equivalent to the perspectives of those charged with the medical management of leading healthcare institutions and programs, the definition fails to recognize the potential for division either within such an elite or between a healthcare elite and the wider population.

Evidence-based definitions distinguish alternative medicine based on its provision of therapies that are unproven, unvalidated, or ineffective and support of theories with no recognized scientific basis. These definitions characterize practices as constituting alternative medicine when, used independently or in place of evidence-based medicine, they are put forward as having the healing effects of medicine, but are not based on evidence gathered with the scientific method. Exemplifying this perspective, a 1998 editorial co-authored by Marcia Angell, a former editor of The New England Journal of Medicine, argued that:

This line of division has been subject to criticism on the grounds that not all forms of standard medical practice have adequately demonstrated evidence of benefit, and that most conventional therapies, if proven to be ineffective, would not later be classified as alternative. Another definition is that alternative medicine refers to a diverse range of related and unrelated products, practices, and theories ranging from biologically plausible practices and products and practices with some evidence, to practices and theories that are directly contradicted by basic science or clear evidence, and products that have been conclusively proven to be ineffective or even toxic and harmful.

Proponents of an evidence-base for medicine such as the Cochrane Collaboration take a position that all systematic reviews of treatments, whether "mainstream" or "alternative", ought to be held to the current standards of scientific method. In 2011, the Cochrane Collaboration proposed that indicators of a therapy's level of acceptance include government licensing of practitioners, coverage by health insurance, statements of approval by government agencies, and recommendation as part of a practice guideline; and that if something is currently a standard, accepted therapy, then it is not likely to be widely considered as alternative.

Australia
The public information website maintained by the National Health and Medical Research Council (NHMRC) of the Commonwealth of Australia uses the acronym "CAM" for a wide range of health care practices, therapies, procedures and devices not within the domain of conventional medicine. In the Australian context this is stated to include acupuncture; aromatherapy; chiropractic; homeopathy; massage; meditation and relaxation therapies; naturopathy; osteopathy; reflexology, traditional Chinese medicine; and the use of vitamin supplements.

Denmark
The Danish National Board of Health's Council for Alternative Medicine (Sundhedsstyrelsens Råd for Alternativ Behandling (SRAB)), an independent institution under the National Board of Health (Danish: Sundhedsstyrelsen), uses the term "alternative medicine" for:
 Treatments performed by therapists that are not authorized healthcare professionals.
 Treatments performed by authorized healthcare professionals, but those based on methods otherwise used mainly outside the healthcare system. People without a healthcare authorisation are [also] allowed to perform the treatments.

Other terms

Allopathic medicine

Allopathic medicine or allopathy is a pejorative term used by proponents of alternative medicine to refer to modern scientific systems of medicine, such as the use of pharmacologically active agents or physical interventions to treat or suppress symptoms or pathophysiologic processes of diseases or conditions.  The expression was coined in 1810 by the creator of homeopathy, Samuel Hahnemann (1755–1843). Among homeopaths and other alternative medicine advocates, the expression "allopathic medicine" is still used to refer to "the broad category of medical practice that is sometimes called Western medicine, biomedicine, evidence-based medicine, or modern medicine."

Use of the term remains common among homeopaths and has spread to other alternative medicine practices. The meaning implied by the label has never been accepted by conventional medicine and is still considered pejorative by some. William Jarvis, an expert on alternative medicine and public health, states that "although many modern therapies can be construed to conform to an allopathic rationale (e.g., using a laxative to relieve constipation), standard medicine has never paid allegiance to an allopathic principle" and that the label "allopath" was "considered highly derisive by regular medicine."

Many modern science-based medical treatments (antibiotics, vaccines, and chemotherapeutics, for example) do not fit Samuel Hahnemann's definition of allopathy, as they seek to prevent illness, or remove the cause of an illness by acting on the cause of disease.

See also 

 List of forms of alternative medicine
 Therapeutic nihilism

Notes

References

Bibliography

External links 

 

 
Pseudoscience